The men's ISSF 50 meter pistol was a shooting sports event held as part of the Shooting at the 1984 Summer Olympics programme. The competition was held on July 29, 1984, at the shooting ranges in Los Angeles. 56 shooters from 38 nations competed. Nations had been limited to two shooters each since the 1952 Games. The event was won by Xu Haifeng of China, with his countryman Wang Yifu taking bronze. As the free pistol was the first medal event in 1984 and the People's Republic of China fully competed for the first time in 1984, these were the first Olympic medals won by competitors from that nation. Ragnar Skanåker of Sweden took silver, 12 years after winning his first medal (gold in 1972); he was the seventh man to win multiple medals in the event and third to win medals 12 years apart (Torsten Ullman had medaled in 1936 and 1948, Harald Vollmar in 1968, 1976, and 1980).

Background

This was the 16th appearance of the ISSF 50 meter pistol event. The event was held at every Summer Olympics from 1896 to 1920 (except 1904, when no shooting events were held) and from 1936 to 2016; it was nominally open to women from 1968 to 1980, although very few women participated these years. A separate women's event would be introduced in 1984. 1896 and 1908 were the only Games in which the distance was not 50 metres; the former used 30 metres and the latter 50 yards.

Three of the top 10 shooters from the 1980 Games returned: seventh-place finisher (and 1972 gold medalist and 1976 fifth-place finisher) Ragnar Skanåker of Sweden, eighth-place finisher Paavo Palokangas of Finland, and ninth-place finisher Sylvio Carvalho of Brazil. Skanåker was also the reigning (1982) world champion. Many of the rest of the 1980 Olympians were from boycotting nations, including the reigning gold medalist and 1982 world championship runner-up Aleksandr Melentyev of the Soviet Union.

The People's Republic of China, Chinese Taipei, Ecuador, India, Oman, Saudi Arabia, and Senegal each made their debut in the event. Sweden and the United States each made their 14th appearance, tied for most of any nation.

Xu used a Hämmerli 150.

Competition format

Each shooter fired 60 shots, in 6 series of 10 shots each, at a distance of 50 metres. The target was round, 50 centimetres in diameter, with 10 scoring rings. Scoring for each shot was up to 10 points, in increments of 1 point. The maximum score possible was 600 points. Any pistol was permitted.

Records

Prior to this competition, the existing world and Olympic records were as follows.

No new world or Olympic records were set during the competition.

Schedule

Results

References

Shooting at the 1984 Summer Olympics
Men's 1984
Men's events at the 1984 Summer Olympics